The Japanese raiders in the Indian Ocean were those vessels used by the Imperial Japanese Navy (IJN) during the Second World War to pursue its war on Allied commerce in that theatre. Possessing a powerful fleet of warships, prior to the start of World War II, the IJN had strategically planned to fight a war of fleet actions, and as a consequence delegated few resources to raiding merchant vessels. Nevertheless, in 1940, two passenger-cargo vessels –   and  – of the Osaka Shipping Line were requisitioned for conversion to armed merchant cruisers (AMC)s, in anticipation of the likely thrust southward by the Japanese. These vessels were subsequently used as merchant raiders attacking Allied commercial shipping along vital sea lanes of communication between Australia and the Middle East. Using their comprehensive armament and speed to their advantage, the raiders experienced a brief period of success.

Background
Nations fighting Britain during both world wars in the 20th century devoted substantial effort to the disruption of oceanic trade as a means of weakening the British Empire. In late 1942, Axis activities in the Indian Ocean had virtually come to an end. German merchant raiders, originally disrupting the shipping lanes in these waters, had with few exceptions, been destroyed by the Royal Navy or begun the long journey home.

By virtue of their powerful battle fleets, the Imperial Japanese Navy (IJN) had strategically planned to fight a war of fleet actions ("Guerre d'escadre"), and as a consequence delegated few resources to raiding merchant vessels ("Guerre de course").  Nonetheless, other than their successful sortie to Ceylon in April 1942, the Japanese Navy  had decided to keep the pressure on the shipping lanes, primarily due to the Allies' ever-growing logistical strength in the war. Large and valuable tankers maintained a continuous stream of oil and other products from the Middle East to Australia and surrounding islands. The continuous pleas by the Germans possibly had a large influence on this decision, as the Indian Ocean was the primary area of operations in which the two Axis powers had the most physical coordination with each other, in regards to re-supply and the exchange of military (naval) intelligence.

Japanese merchant raiders

In 1940, two passenger-cargo vessels of the Osaka Shipping Line were requisitioned for conversion to armed merchant cruisers (AMC)s, in anticipation of the likely thrust southward by the Japanese. The main armament consisted of eight 140 mm/50 caliber guns, which were augmented by two 80 mm guns, and four 25 mm guns. There were four 533 mm torpedo tubes in twin mounts, and each vessel had two Mitsubishi F1M2 "Pete" Type 0 observation seaplanes, each armed with two fixed forward firing Type 97 machine guns, one flexibly mounted rearward-firing Type 92 machine gun and 120 kg of bombs.

Initial deployment
With their heavy armament, the two Japanese merchant raiders could overpower any smaller combatant or merchant vessel, and their speed enabled them (in combination with their floatplanes) to search large areas of ocean. In service, they were organized as the 24th Special Cruiser Squadron under Rear-Admiral Moriharu Takeda. Hōkoku Maru was modified to serve as Admiral Takeda's flagship with space for his staff of four officers and eighteen men.

The 24th Special Cruiser Squadron departed Hiroshima Bay on 15 November 1941 under radio silence and blacked out at night to arrive in a standby position at Jaluit Atoll in the Marshall Islands. They departed Jaluit on 26 November 1941 to patrol the sea lanes between Australia, Samoa, Fiji, the United States, and the Panama Canal. The operational plan was for one ship to lie-to and drift while performing maintenance, as the other ship carried out a perimeter patrol searching for enemy shipping. The two ships would spend the hours of darkness within visual range; the ships then reversed roles the following day. Following the Attack on Pearl Harbor, the search objective changed from avoiding detection to locating enemy commerce.

Following sunset on 12 December 1941, Hōkoku Maru stopped the 6,210-ton United States freighter Vincent bound for the Panama Canal from Sydney, Australia at 23 south, 118 west. The old freighter was sunk after taking her crew of 38 aboard the two raiders. The Japanese ships then left the area to avoid any response to Vincents radio SOS.

Routine searching resumed on 23 December 1941. On 31 December, a seaplane from Aikoku Maru found and circled the 3,275-ton United States freighter Malama bound for New Zealand from Honolulu with a cargo of US Army Air Force trucks and aircraft engines. The seaplane was observed by Malama, but was apparently lost to operational problems before returning to Aikoku Maru. The squadron commenced a search for the missing seaplane at 1810 and searched through the moonlit night. Aircraft were launched at 0700 on 1 January 1942 to expand the search. One of the seaplanes found Malama at 0910, circled at low altitude and ordered the ship to stop with a burst of machine gun fire. Malama began to broadcast distress messages which continued until 1415. Malama was scuttled by her crew at a position 25 south, 155 west when the aircraft returned. The squadron left the area after taking the freighter's crew of 38 aboard as prisoners.

On 8 January 1942, the raiders resumed search operations and between 16 and 20 January the squadron intercepted extremely loud radio signals causing them to believe Allied warships were nearby. They successfully evaded detection by Admiral William Halsey's Task Force 8. They replenished at Truk on 4 February 1942 and transferred the prisoners to the Oita Bay Naval Air Command on 13 February.

The squadron then entered the Kure Navy Yard where each ship received eight modern 14 cm (5.5-inch) guns to replace the four 15 cm (5.9-inch) guns of Russo-Japanese War vintage installed the previous autumn. More modern seaplanes were embarked when the squadron deployed to the Indian Ocean with the additional duty of resupplying the Japanese submarines operating in the Mozambique Channel. Between 5 June and 13 July 1942, the submarines sank 21 ships, for a total of 92,498 tons. The Hōkoku Maru and Aikoku Maru added additional ships to that score. With these successes, they had sunk or captured five merchant ships within a year, totalling 31,303 tons. They left Singapore on 5 November on their fourth sortie, under the overall command of Captain Imazato Hiroshi.

Action against the Ondina
The  was a modern tanker built for La Corona, one of Shell's shipping companies. She was new, relatively fast and by contemporary standards not  lightly armed with a 4"/50 caliber gun on her stern and several machine guns for anti-aircraft use. Under Captain W. Horsman, she was deployed between Fremantle in Australia and Abadan on the oil-rich shores of the Persian Gulf. On her journey to Abadan, she was protected by a single corvette,  under the command of Lieutenant Commander W.J. Wilson, RNR. One of the Australian-type /minesweepers, Bengal was one of four ships of her class that had been allocated to the Royal Indian Navy. She only had one 3-inch gun (a 4-inch gun was not available), which made her firepower barely enough to protect the Ondina from submarines, let alone from enemy surface raiders. The two ships departed Fremantle on 5 November 1942, expecting a long but uneventful trip.

Sightings
On 11 November 1942 at 11:45 in the morning, naval authorities in Fremantle received an SOS signal sent out by the Bengal, reporting that she and the Ondina were under attack by two  raiders, identified as being Japanese, at position 19.38° South  93.5° East.

As no Allied ships were reported in the vicinity, the Allied sailors could only assume the ships bearing down on them were hostile and for some time these ships were even identified as Japanese aircraft carriers. On the Bengal, the lookouts saw the two AMCs a few minutes later. The ships both made a 90 degree turn to starboard away from the enemy in a north-north-west direction. Bengal then turned and headed straight for the attackers, hoping to buy enough time for the Ondina to escape. The sensible thing to do for the Ondina was to obey the order to escape, but the captain decided to stay, as his ship, armed with a 4-inch gun, was still the more powerful of the two. In addition, the Ondina could only do  while the Japanese ships could make .

Attack
The Aikoku Maru under Captain Tamotsu Oishi, and Hōkoku Maru under Captain Hiroshi Imazato, commenced firing at 1200 hours and soon straddled the Ondina with their cruiser-armament. The first hit on Ondina ripped off a part of the main mast, leaving only a stump. The Ondina herself had her answer ready: the third shell fired was a hit on the superstructure of Hōkoku Maru, but apparently with little effect.

Content with the hit, the gun captain then ordered the gunners to concentrate their fire on the stern. A few moments later, a hit on the starboard torpedo mount turned the Hōkoku Maru into a ball of red and yellow flames, and as the ship emerged from the smoke, she was listing heavily to starboard and simultaneously started to settle by the stern. The explosion ripped off the stern and threw her two floatplanes overboard, while massive fires raged in the superstructure.

Hōkoku Maru was not built as a warship, and therefore did not have a sufficient number of watertight bulkheads. Shells toppled from their lockers as a result of the increasing list and threw sailors overboard. Men, covered with blood and suffering from burns, tried to fight the flames. Reports came in indicating large fires in the engine-room and the loss of all electricity. There was little hope of salvaging the Hōkoku Maru, Captain Imazato could do nothing else than order "abandon ship".

The Aikoku Maru picked up a total of 278 survivors from a crew of 354. Captain Imazato was one of the 76 killed during the action. There were no reports of damage or casualties aboard the Aikoku Maru, which soon avenged her sister ship, scoring several hits on Ondina. Nevertheless, her shells and torpedoes had little effect on the empty tanker, as the large number of watertight tanks could keep it afloat under the most difficult circumstances. One shell from the Japanese ship hit her in the forecastle, but did little damage. Her gunners had been firing continuously at the Japanese, claiming several hits but their ammunition supply was soon depleted. At 1245, her last shell had been fired and her captain decided there was little he could do for the Ondina. He steamed away at full speed, chased by gun splashes. After laying a smokescreen, she took a hit in the stern which had no effect on her escape. The last the men aboard Bengal saw of the Ondina was her trying to evade the shells, continuously straddled by the Aikoku Maru. A shell was seen hitting her abaft the bridge. Some time later, a second explosion was seen aboard Hōkoku Maru, still burning and sinking. After leaving the scene, Bengal set course for Diego Garcia, where the captain reported the Ondina and one enemy AMC sunk.

Survival
Bengals captain was right about one thing, the Hokoku Maru had indeed sunk, but after Bengal had disappeared over the horizon, Ondina was still steaming around at full speed. As a tanker, she only had a limited ammunition supply. Ondina herself only had twelve shells left, four of which she fired at the Hōkoku Maru, the rest at Aikoku Maru, apparently without scoring a hit. A last attempt to escape by dumping smokebuoys overboard was unsuccessful, and the captain ordered the crew to abandon ship to avoid further bloodshed. The engines were stopped, the lifeboats lowered and a white flag was hoisted, all under continuous fire from the Aikoku Maru. A few moments later, Captain Horsman was killed by a piece of shrapnel from a shell hitting the bridge. Two lifeboats and two rafts were lowered into the water and later, another lifeboat was in the water with the remainder of the crew. Most of the crew (with the exception of officers and guncrew) were Chinese, and they had been troublesome during the whole action, refusing to provide any assistance to  save the ship.

Both left big holes in the starboard side, but did little to sink the ship itself. Its tanks had been empty and the ship remained afloat on the other, undamaged tanks, despite the 30 or 35 degree list. Aikoku Maru then changed course and the Japanese gunners opened fire on the drifting lifeboats. One sailor was killed, three others were badly wounded. One of them was a young British sailor named Henry, originally assigned to the Bengal. Satisfied with the results, Aikoku Maru steamed away to pick up survivors from Hōkoku Maru. The Aikoku Maru came back once more, firing a torpedo which missed the tanker. She paid scant attention to the survivors, convinced the Ondina was doomed.

Meanwhile, the men in the lifeboats had given the deceased a seaman's burial and then exchanged thoughts about what to do next. The first officer, Rehwinkel, wanted to return to the tanker, but only one man in the gun crew was willing to go with him. Most of the others were convinced the Ondina was about to go down. Not without trouble, Rehwinkel managed to assemble a small number of men and returned to the ship, where counterflooding reduced the list. Inspection revealed that her engines were also still intact. Small fires were extinguished and the last crew members in the lifeboats were taken aboard after they were convinced there was no danger of sinking. The long leg back to Fremantle began. The lifeboats were patched up as well as possible, in case the Aikoku Maru came back.

Return
The British sailor Henry was in very bad shape. He had a crushed leg and after two days the first officer was forced to send out a signal for help. The signal was sent uncoded, because the codebooks had all been thrown overboard when "abandon ship" was ordered. This unexpected signal caused a shock in Colombo, as the Ondina had been reported sunk and logically, the British suspected a Japanese trick. A request went out from Fremantle to report her position.

Wary of a trap, the Ondina did not reply. Without medical attention for her wounded, the Ondina steamed towards Fremantle. The lookouts had reported a ship some time earlier and the Catalina was asked if that ship could provide much needed help. The unknown vessel proved to be a hospital ship where doctors immediately began a series of blood transfusions which succeeded in saving Henry's life.

On 18 November, the Ondina entered Fremantle after a journey only a few ships had experienced and even fewer had survived. The corvette Bengal had entered Diego Garcia the day before. Ondina remained in Australia as a depot ship until 1943, when she was finally repaired. Both Bengal and Ondina survived the war.

Aftermath
In retrospect, this battle was not only a tactical success for the Allies, it also had strategic implications. The loss of the Hōkoku Maru forced the Japanese to abandon raider warfare and subsequently the Imperial Japanese Navy did not try to break the lifeline again until early 1944 when a force of three heavy cruisers raided Allied shipping in the Indian Ocean.

It remains uncertain as to which vessel fired the fatal shot that resulted in the destruction of the Hōkoku Maru. Both the Ondina and Bengal claimed to have scored the vital hit, although the Japanese themselves thought it was the Ondina. According to them, her shell hit the starboard torpedo launcher, causing the torpedo to explode. At the time, the Bengal was given the credit, which was used by the British as propaganda in India, where they were struggling to keep control of the local population. Nevertheless, for its actions during the battle, the Ondina was given a rare Dutch distinction, the Koninklijke Vermelding by Dagorder, issued on 9 July 1948. Captain W. Horsman became Ridder in de Militaire Willemsorde der 4de Klasse posthumously and was Mentioned in Dispatches, while the gunner, Hammond, received the Distinguished Service Medal and the Bronzen Kruis. The captain of the Bengal, Lieutenant-Commander Wilson, received the Distinguished Service Order, while others of his crew were also decorated.

Aikoku Maru was converted into a high-speed transport and was sunk in February 1944 during Operation Hailstone, the bombardment by American aircraft of the Japanese base at Truk in the South Seas Mandate.

See also
List of Japanese auxiliary cruiser commerce raiders

Notes

References

External links
 Royal Netherlands Navy Warships of World War II

Naval battles of World War II involving Japan
Battles and operations of World War II
World War II naval operations and battles of the Southeast Asia Theatre
World War II commerce raiders